The 2000–01 Buffalo Sabres season was the 31st season for the team in the National Hockey League (NHL). The Sabres finished with a 46–30–5–1 record in the regular season, and won the Conference Quarterfinals (4–2) over the Philadelphia Flyers, but lost the Conference Semifinals (4–3) to the Pittsburgh Penguins. It was also the final time they made the playoffs before the 2004–05 NHL lockout.

Off-season

Regular season
The Sabres allowed the fewest goals (184), had the most shutouts (13), allowed the fewest power-play goals (40) and had the best penalty-kill percentage (88.02%).

Final standings

Schedule and results

Playoffs
2001 Stanley Cup playoffs

(4) Philadelphia Flyers vs. (5) Buffalo Sabres
The Flyers were entering this year's playoffs still trying to forget the Eastern Conference finals the previous year. In 2000, they had a 3–1 series lead against the eventual Stanley Cup champion New Jersey Devils, but lost the next three. Head coach Craig Ramsay was fired in the middle of the season, with general manager Bobby Clarke explaining his decision was based on the fact his Flyers were not "tough enough". As Ramsay's replacement, Clarke hired ex-Flyer tough guy and former teammate Bill Barber. The Sabres season was not as complicated, as head coach Lindy Ruff led his Sabres to one of their best regular seasons in recent history. In the playoffs, the two teams had met three times in four years, with the most recent series ending in with a Flyers win. The Sabres would look for revenge in the city of brotherly love.

After Philadelphia was stopped by Dominik Hasek and the Sabres in the first two games, one of which was ended by a Jay McKee overtime goal, the Flyers came out in Game 3 determined to win a game before losing the first three, and they did by one goal, but they lost again to the Sabres in Game 4 in overtime after Curtis Brown beat goaltender Roman Cechmanek. The Flyers won in Game 5 by a two-goal margin, but were hammered by the Sabres in Game 6: they gave up a total of eight goals, five of which were surrendered by Cechmanek, who was replaced early by Brian Boucher, who himself conceded three goals. Hasek recorded another shutout in Game 6 as the Sabres progressed to the conference semifinals.

Series highlight
 Game One: Sabres 2, Flyers 1
 Game Two: Sabres 4, Flyers 3 (Overtime)
 Game Three: Flyers 3, Sabres 2
 Game Four: Sabres 4, Flyers 3 (Overtime)
 Game Five: Flyers 3, Sabres 1
 Game Six: Sabres 8, Flyers 0

(5) Buffalo Sabres vs. (6) Pittsburgh Penguins
Entering the series, Buffalo held the best penalty killing (PK) squad which killed 88%, and Pittsburgh entered the series with the fifth best powerplay (PP) squad, which scored on 20% of its opportunities. However, the Buffalo PK and the Pittsburgh PP would underachieve during the series: Pittsburgh only scored 4 times on 27 opportunities (14%), so, consequently, Buffalo's PK percent dropped to 86.  Buffalo also scored four power play goals, but on 33 chances (12%).

The Sabres and Penguins had evenly matched goaltending: Pittsburgh goaltenders saved 155 shots out of 172 (90.2%), and Buffalo's saved 166 shots out of 183 (90.8%). Both teams scored 17 goals during the series, and they also scored the same number of power play goals, four.

The Sabres just could not put the puck past Johan Hedberg in Game 1, with the Penguins needing only star center Mario Lemieux's first-period goal to finish off Buffalo and take an early series lead. Dominik Hasek gave up three goals, the other two of which came courtesy of centers Wayne Primeau and Jan Hrdina in the second half of the third period. Penguins winger Jaromir Jagr, who assisted on the Lemieux goal in the first period, injured his leg in the third period and would miss Game 2. Both teams were rather inept on the powerplay, wasting five conversion opportunities each.

In Game 2, the first period had no scoring, despite five different powerplays for the two teams.  Then, about halfway through the second period, Penguins center Robert Lang scored a goal to give the Penguins a 1–0. Three minutes later, Sabres center Stu Barnes tied the game with the game's only powerplay goal. In the third period, Pittsburgh would score two more goals through defenceman Andrew Ference and an empty-netter by Alexei Kovalev.

For the second consecutive game, there were no goals scored in the first period of Game 3, despite a combined 17 shots on goal. The Penguins scored on the power play in the second period to take the lead, but Sabres center Curtis Brown would tie the game through an even-strength goal as the period would end at 1–1. Johan Hedberg had been solid in the net for the Penguins, but conceded 3 goals from just 11 shots in the third period. At about the halfway point in the third period, Sabres defenseman Jason Woolley scored the go-ahead goal, and three minutes later, Miroslav Satan would score another goal to give Buffalo a two-goal lead. Defenseman James Patrick finished off the game with an empty-net goal to send the Sabres to a 4–1 victory in Game 3.

Building off the road win in Game 3, Buffalo scored the first goal in Game 4 very early in the first period by center Jean-Pierre Dumont, but the Penguins would respond with a powerplay goal by center Martin Straka. Sabres center Curtis Brown scored a short-handed goal late in the first period to give Buffalo the edge heading into the locker rooms. The second period featured only one goal by Janne Laukkanen, set up by Jagr and Lemieux, and the game was tied up going into the third.  Stu Barnes scored twice in the third period, and the Sabres went on to win the game by three, five goals to two.  Both teams were effective on the powerplay, each scoring one goal on two chances.  Coming off two straight home losses, Buffalo works hard on the road to swipe the two home games back, swinging the series back to Buffalo's advantage.

Penguins wingman Jaromir Jagr initiated the scoring in game five with a powerplay goal, the only goal in the first period.  Pittsburgh would tack on another goal early on in the second period by winger Aleksey Morozov, but Sabres center Chris Gratton would respond with a powerplay goal, and the Penguins still had the lead until they gave up another short-handed goal to Curtis Brown.  Curtis Brown's goal forced overtime, and Stu Barnes would score the game-winning goal to give Buffalo the series lead.  The Sabres were down by two goals early but fought back and won the game by scoring three unanswered goals.  Game five was the first overtime game in the string of three that would end the series.

Buffalo's right winger Maxim Afinogenov scored in the first half of the first period of game six to give the Sabres and early lead, a lead the team would need because Pittsburgh's Alexei Kovalev tied the game up early in the second period.  Donald Audette would break up the tied game with an even-strength goal late in the second period.  Pittsburgh would persevere and score the tying goal with less than a minute to go in the third period courtesy of Mario Lemieux, so this match headed to overtime.  Martin Straka was the hero of the Penguins on that night, as he scored the game-winning goal about halfway through the overtime period.  Both teams didn't score on any of the combined seven chances they saw, and the fabled game seven was due.

In game seven, the first period was an uneventful one, featuring no goals and few penalties, but the second period was a different story.  Buffalo struck first as Jean-Pierre Dumont scored very early in the period, but that one-goal lead wouldn't last because Andrew Ference scored a powerplay goal to even things up at one goal apiece.  Just about 30 seconds into the third period, Buffalo struck again as winger Steve Heinze scored a powerplay goal.  Robert Lang would then score to tie the game up at two goals apiece. With a minute remaining in the third period and the Sabres applying pressure in the Penguins zone, Penguins defenceman Darius Kasparaitis grabbed the puck and threw it over the boards into the crowd. No penalty was called on the play and the game went to overtime. Later, Kasparaitis would win the game and the series for the Penguins as he scored off of passes from Jagr and Lang.  Pittsburgh went on to face the New Jersey Devils in the conference finals.

Series highlight
 Game One: Penguins 3, Sabres 0
 Game Two: Penguins 3, Sabres 1
 Game Three: Sabres 4, Penguins 1
 Game Four: Sabres 5, Penguins 2
 Game Five: Sabres 3, Penguins 2 (Overtime)
 Game Six: Penguins 3, Sabres 2 (Overtime)
 Game Seven: Penguins 3, Sabres 2 (Overtime)

Player statistics

Regular season
Scoring

Goaltending

Playoffs
Scoring

Goaltending

Awards and records

Transactions

Draft picks
Buffalo's draft picks at the 2000 NHL Entry Draft held at the Pengrowth Saddledome in Calgary, Alberta.

Farm teams

Rochester Americans finished with a record of 46-22-9-3.

They were swept out of the playoffs in the first round.

Head coach: Randy Cunneyworth.
Assistant coach: Jon Christano.

See also
 2000–01 NHL season

Notes

References
 2000-01 Buffalo Sabres Statistics

Buff
Buff
Buffalo Sabres seasons
Buffalo
Buffalo